Craftsman Book Company of America, Inc. is a  U.S. publisher with a comprehensive range of technical references for construction professionals.

Locations
Craftsman Book Co.'s office is located in Carlsbad, CA. 6058 Corte Del Cedro, Carlsbad, CA 92011.

Product lines
As well as books the company publishes building estimation software on CD and online.

References

Book publishing companies based in California
Companies based in Carlsbad, California
Construction organizations
Privately held companies based in California